Mutatocoptops is a genus of longhorn beetles of the subfamily Lamiinae, containing the following species:

 Mutatocoptops alboapicalis Pic, 1925
 Mutatocoptops anancyloides (Schwarzer, 1925)
 Mutatocoptops annulicornis (Heller, 1926)
 Mutatocoptops bituberosa (Pascoe, 1866)
 Mutatocoptops borneensis Breuning, 1968
 Mutatocoptops cambodgensis Breuning, 1974
 Mutatocoptops celebensis Breuning, 1964
 Mutatocoptops diversa (Pascoe, 1865)
 Mutatocoptops malaisiana Breuning, 1973
 Mutatocoptops similis Breuning, 1935
 Mutatocoptops tonkinea Pic, 1925

References

Mesosini